Stroud District is a district in the ceremonial county of Gloucestershire, South West England. The district covers many outlying towns and villages. The towns forming the district are Dursley, Minchinhampton, Nailsworth, Painswick, Stonehouse, 
Berkeley, Stroud (The administrative centre) and Wotton-under-Edge. The district is geographically located between the Tewkesbury district to the northwest and northeast, Gloucester district to the north, the Cotswold district to the north-northeast. east and southeast, The Forest of Dean district to the north-northwest, west, and southwest and the South Gloucestershire unitary authority to the southeast, south, and south-southwest. The largest settlement by far is Stroud, followed by the village of Cam and Stonehouse.

History
Stroud District Council was formed under the Local Government Act 1972, on 1 April 1974, by a merger of Nailsworth and Stroud urban districts, Dursley Rural District, Stroud Rural District, and parts of Gloucester Rural District, Sodbury Rural District and Thornbury Rural District. In 1991 following a boundary review the Parish of Hillesely and Tresham was transferred from Northavon District Council to Stroud. This area was formerly in the Chipping Sodbury Rural District Council area. At the same review the parish of Quedgeley (formerly in Gloucester Rural) was transferred from Stroud to Gloucester City.

The area is rich in Iron Age and Roman remnants and is of particular interest to archaeologists for its Neolithic burial grounds, of which there are over 100. Much of its wealth was built on the cloth industry during the Victorian era, and its many mills, most of which are now listed buildings, survive as testament to this. Much of the landscape in this area is designated as an Area of Outstanding Natural Beauty. The esteemed Cotswold Way walk leads through the area. There are gliding clubs at Aston Down and Nympsfield.

Politics

Elections to the district council since 2016 are now held on a whole council basis every four years. Previously since 1983 elections by thirds took place in three out of every four years. At the 2016 election, the coalition of Labour, Greens and the Liberal Democrats retained its majority on Stroud District Council. The 2019 general election saw
Siobhan Kathleen Baillie, a British Conservative Party politician, elected as Member of Parliament for Stroud.

Stroud District Council elects 51 councillors from 27 wards. Following the May 2021 local elections the Green Party and Liberal Democrats both increased their number of seats on the council. On 18 May 2021 the Stroud News and Journal reported that "Stroud District Council will continue to be run by an alliance of Labour, Green and Liberal Democrat councillors."
On 30 June 2022, leader of the council, Doina Cornell, left the Labour Party following her removal from the long list of candidates for the Stroud constituency. Three other members of the council also left the Labour Party the day after. On 21 July 2022, leader of the council, Doina Cornell, resigned from her position as leader of the council. The council in turn elected Catherine Braun of the Green Party as leader of the council, as following the resignations the Green Party formed the largest portion of the alliance. Natalie Bennett of the Labour Party was elected deputy leader of the council.

The inaugural meeting of the new Council following elections in June 1973 was on 29 June 1973 at Stroud Subscription Rooms.

Responsibilities

Stroud District Council carries out a variety of district council functions including:
Benefits – Housing and Council Tax
Car Parking
Concessionary Travel
Council Tax – Administration and Collection
Elections and Electoral Registration
Environmental Health (includes Domestic and Commercial Premises)
Food Safety and Hygiene Complaints
Noise Pollution and Pest Control
Housing Administration
Licensing
Caravan Sites
Planning, including Planning Applications, Advice and Appeals
Public Conveniences (in some locales)
Health and Leisure Centres
Refuse Collection
Recycling
Tourism and Visitor Information.

Notable Members of Stroud District Council (and predecessors)
Margaret Hills (née Robertson) was the first woman elected to Stroud Urban District Council in 1928. where she stood as a representative of the Stroud Women's Citizens Association (SWCA). She remained a member until 1936 when the council was expanded to cover Cainscross and Rodborough.

David Drew (politician) is also a former member of the council originally representing the Stonehouse Ward and more recently the Paganhill and Farmhill Ward. Tom Levitt is also a former member and served for a short time before moving to High Peak in the early 1990s.

References

External links
Stroud District Council
Stroud Voices (search page) – oral history site

 
Non-metropolitan districts of Gloucestershire